= Felipe Montes =

Mexican writer

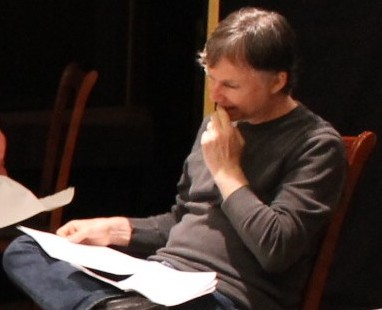
Felipe Montes

Felipe Montes (born 1961 in Monterrey, Mexico) is a Latin American writer. His literary creations, those already published and those that are in process of creation, gradually mold into one whole and huge work that grows with each written book, which Montes titles Monterrey.

== Works ==
- 1996 Casa natal (poetry). Editorial El Reino.
- 1998 Catedrales (poetry). Vestigios.
- 2001 El Vigilante (novel). Plaza & Janés.
- 2003 El Enrabiado (novel). Mondadori.
- 2003 Sólido azul (novel). Conarte.
- 2008 El Evangelio del Niño Fidencio. Editorial Fábrica Literaria.
- 2009 Dolores. (novel). Editorial Acero.
- 2010 La casa natal y el poso de fuego. (novel). Editorial Acero.
- 2013 Yerbabuena. (novel). Editorial 27editores.
